Slieve Rua is a karst (limestone) hill in The Burren in County Clare, Ireland. The eccentrically shaped hill is located near Mullaghmore within Burren National Park.

References

Mountains and hills of County Clare